The following is a list of the 139 municipalities (comuni) of the Province of Varese, Lombardy, Italy.

List

See also 
List of municipalities of Italy

References 

Varese